Alexandria Marie Kilponen (born August 8, 1999) is an American softball player. She attended Valor Christian High School in Highlands Ranch, Colorado, where she was named Colorado's state Gatorade Player of the Year in softball for 2018. She later attended Louisiana State University, where she pitched on the LSU Tigers softball team. In her freshman year, Kilponen led LSU softball to a berth in the 2019 NCAA Division I softball tournament Super Regionals, where they lost to Minnesota, 2–0.

References

External links
 
 LSU Tigers bio

1999 births
Living people
LSU Tigers softball players
Sportspeople from Denver
Softball players from Colorado
21st-century American women